The Xianyou dialect (Pu-Xian Min:  /) is a dialect of Pu-Xian Min Chinese spoken in Xianyou, Putian in the southeast coast of Fujian province, China.

Phonology
The Xianyou dialect has 15 initials, 45 rimes and 7 tones.

Initials

Rimes

Tones

Assimilation

Tone sandhi
The Xianyou dialect has extremely extensive tone sandhi rules: in an utterance, only the last syllable pronounced is not affected by the rules. 

The two-syllable tonal sandhi rules are shown in the table below (the rows give the first syllable's original citation tone, while the columns give the citation tone of the second syllable):

References

Pu-Xian Min